The A-ration (officially Field Ration, Type A) is a United States military ration consisting of fresh, refrigerated, or frozen foods. A-rations may be served in dining facilities, prepared in the field using field kitchens, or prepared at a fixed facility and transported to field locations in containers. Its modern successor is the Unitized Group Ration – A (UGR-A), which combines multiple types of rations, including the A-ration, under one unified system.

The A-ration differs from other American alphabetized rations such as the B-ration, consisting of canned or preserved food; C-ration, consisting of prepared wet food when A- and B-rations are not available; D-ration, consisting of military chocolate; K-ration, consisting of three balanced meals; and emergency rations, intended for emergencies when other food or rations are unavailable.

Unitized Group Ration A

A-rations today may include the Unitized Group Ration – A, a hybrid meal kit designed to feed a group of 50 people for one meal. The UGR-A has several different varieties, including a tray-based heat and serve (T-rat) form, heated by hot water immersion when a field kitchen is not available, or the express form, with a self-heating module and disposable accessories. The UGR-A is used to sustain military personnel during worldwide operations that allow organized food service facilities.  

The UGR-A includes perishable/frozen type entrees (A-rations) along with commercial-type components and perishable/frozen type entrees to provide the luxury of an A-ration meal in the field, configured into individual meal modules for ease of ordering, distribution, and preparation.

Notes

External links
 Website on Military Nutrition Research – This website documents more than a century of scientific inquiry conducted by, for, and about the U.S. military to promote and sustain the nutritional health of military personnel and citizens alike.

Military food of the United States
Military food